The United States presidential election debates were held during the 1976 presidential election. Three debates were held between Republican candidate, incumbent president Gerald Ford and Democratic governor Jimmy Carter, the major candidates. One debate was held with their vice presidential running mates, Bob Dole and Walter Mondale.

The vice presidential debate was held on October 15 at the Alley Theatre. The presidential debates were held on September 23 at the Walnut Street Theater, October 6 at the Palace of Fine Arts and on October 22 at the College of William & Mary, ahead of the November 7 Election Day. All of the debates were sponsored by the League of Women Voters. In each of the debates, the candidates received questions in turn with three minutes to answer and a 60-second rebuttal.

Participant selection
In 1976 only the two candidates from the major political parties, Gerald Ford and Jimmy Carter, were invited. As a result, only Bob Dole and Walter Mondale met the criteria for the vice presidential debate.

Debate schedule 

Three presidential debates were scheduled by the League of Women Voters:
 September 23 at the Walnut Street Theater, with questions from moderator Edwin Newman of NBC;
 October 6 at the Palace of Fine Arts, with questions from moderator Pauline Frederick of NPR;
 October 22 at the College of William & Mary, with questions from moderator Barbara Walters of ABC;

One vice-presidential debate was held:
 October 15 at the Alley Theatre, moderated by James Hoge of Chicago Sun Times.

First presidential debate (Walnut Street Theater)
The Debate was held in the Walnut Street Theater in Philadelphia, Pennsylvania.

Edwin Newman of NBC moderated the debate. A panel consisting of Elizabeth Drew, Frank Reynolds and James Gannon posed questions to the candidates. 

This was the first presidential debate in 16 years. 81 minutes into the broadcast of the 90 minute debate, the sound was lost and the debate was paused for 27 minutes before the problem was fixed and the debate could resume.

Transcript
 from the Commission on Presidential Debates website.

Viewership
An estimated 69.7 million viewers tuned into the debates.

Second presidential debate (Palace of Fine Arts)
The debate was held at the Palace of Fine Arts in San Francisco, California

Pauline Frederick of NPR posed the questions for each candidate.

Transcript
 from the Commission on Presidential Debates website.

Viewership
An estimated 63.9 million viewers tuned into the debate.

Vice presidential debate (Alley Theatre)
The vice presidential debate was held in the Alley Theatre in Houston, Texas. It was the first vice presidential debate in American history.

James Hoge of Chicago Sun Times posed the questions for each candidate.

Transcript

Viewership
An estimated 43.2 million viewers tuned into the debate.

Third presidential debate (College of William & Mary) 
The Debate was held in Phi Beta Kappa Memorial Hall at the College of William & Mary in Williamsburg, Virginia.

Barbara Walters of ABC posed the questions for each candidate.

Transcript
 from the Commission on Presidential Debates website.

Viewership
An estimated 62.7 million viewers tuned into the debates.

References 

1976
Debates